The Kempe Award for Distinguished Ecologists is a prize awarded biennially from 1994 onwards to recognise outstanding individuals within the science of ecology. The Award is an honorarium of SEK 50,000. The award is given by the  Kempe Foundations  (Kempefonden), Umeå University and the Swedish University of Agricultural Sciences in cooperation.

Kempe Award Laureates
1994 Stuart L. Pimm  
1996 F. Stuart Chapin III  
1998 John Lawton  
2000 Daniel Simberloff 
2002 David Read 
2004 Mary Power 
2006 Peter M. Vitousek 
2008 Stephen P. Hubbell  
2011 Ilkka Hanski

See also

 List of ecology awards

References

Awards established in 1994
Ecology awards
Swedish awards
1994 establishments in Sweden